Han Hong-ki (Hangul: 한홍기; 1924 – 1996) was a South Korean football player and manager.

He was the South Korea national football team manager and manager of POSCO FC in 1973.

Honours

Managerial

International
South Korea
 Asian Games (1) : 1970

References

External links

South Korean footballers
Pohang Steelers managers
1924 births
1996 deaths
Association footballers not categorized by position
South Korean football managers